The Kay-Gees were an American funk and disco group during the 1970s, protégés of Kool & the Gang.  The group featured Amir Bayyan (Kevin Bell), younger brother to Kool & the Gang's Robert "Kool" Bell and Ronald Bell (Khalis Bayyan), who subsequently joined his brothers in Kool & the Gang, as well as Kevin Lassiter, Michael Cheek, Callie Cheek, Dennis White, Glen Griffin,Fernando Arocho, Greg Radford, Huey Harris, Peter Duarte, Ray Wright and Wilson Becket.

Legacy
In 1992, their 1974 song "Who's the Man (With the Master Plan)" was sampled by Dr. Dre for his hip hop album, The Chronic. The same year, House of Pain sampled the song in the chorus of their own version of the song, released the next year under the same name (but without the sub-name) and featured in a 1993 film, also of the same name. In 2005, their song Heavenly Dream was sampled by hip hop artist Kanye West, for his second album, Late Registration.

Discography
Keep On Bumpin' & Masterplan (1974) U.S. #199
Find a Friend (1976)
Kilowatt (1977)
Burn Me Up (1979)

References

American funk musical groups